Nosce is a Filipino surname.

The surname can be traced back to the late 19th century in the unpretentious municipalities of Lucena and Tayabas, province of Tayabas, known today as the Quezon Province located in the central part of the island of Luzon, Republic of the Philippines.

Surnames